The NR-40 (from , НР-40 nozh razvedchika meaning "scout's knife" or Finka) was a Soviet combat knife introduced in 1940 and used throughout World War II. The NR-40 has a 152 mm blade with a clip point, a large ricasso, a black wooden handle, and an S-shaped guard. The guard is "inverted" (unlike most S-shaped guards, it curves towards the edge) because standard Soviet Army grips called for holding the knife with the edge upwards.

History 

In the beginning of the 20th century, Finnish puukko knives started becoming popular with criminals in most cities of the Russian Empire. Local knife-makers then began modifying the Finnish woodsman's tool to make it more useful for fighting; for example, making the blade longer, changing from a flat back to a clip point, and adding a large guard. The resulting weapon, still called a "Finnish knife" or "finka" in Russian, looked rather different from a typical puukko. "Finnish knives" were ubiquitous in the criminal underworld of Russia and Soviet Union throughout the first half of the 20th century. Because of the criminal association, the "Finnish knife" was banned in the Soviet Union in the 1930s, much like the switchblade would later be banned in the West.

The Winter War revealed a number of deficiencies in Soviet weaponry; among other issues, the Soviet infantry lacked a good combat knife. As a result, in 1940, the Soviet Army adopted the NR-40 – essentially, a mass-produced version of the Russian gangster's "finka".

"Black knife" division 

NR-40 was mostly produced at the ZiK (ЗиК) factory in Zlatoust, Urals. Once the Ural Volunteer Tank Corps was formed in 1943, all its soldiers and officers were supplied with a special issue of NR-40 (also known as "black knife"). The formation was later named by Germans as «Schwarzmesser Panzer-Division». The unofficial divisional anthem mentioned the nickname as well ("Дивизия черных ножей", Black Knife Division).

Modern variants of NR-40 

NR-40 is no longer used by the army, but modern remakes and almost exact replicas of NR-40 are produced in Zlatoust to this day. A knife of exactly the same proportions would be legally a weapon, thus prohibiting free sale. To circumvent that, producers either use a thinner blade or remove the guard.

See also 
 Puukko
 KA-BAR
 Fairbairn–Sykes fighting knife
 Kampfmesser 42
 Ballistic knife
 NRS-2

References 
 Нож разведчика (НР-40) 
 "Shtrafbat", a modern remake of NR-40 by A&R
 "Black knife", an almost exact replica by Zlatgravura

Military knives of the Soviet Union
World War II infantry weapons of the Soviet Union
Weapons and ammunition introduced in 1940